Walter Butler (30 May 1882 – 12 March 1966) was an Australian cricketer. He played one first-class match for Western Australia in 1921/22.

See also
 List of Western Australia first-class cricketers

References

External links
 

1882 births
1966 deaths
Australian cricketers
Western Australia cricketers
Cricketers from Adelaide